Joyce Carolyn Hearn (née Camp; June 16, 1929 – January 20, 2021) was an American politician in the state of South Carolina. She served in the South Carolina House of Representatives as a member of the Republican Party from 1975 to 1990, representing Richland County, South Carolina. She was a businesswoman and educator.

Hearn was born in Cedartown, Georgia. She went to the University of West Georgia and University of Georgia. Hearn graduated from Ohio State University. She taught at the Eau Claire High School in Columbia, South Carolina.

References

1929 births
2021 deaths
People from Cedartown, Georgia
Politicians from Columbia, South Carolina
Ohio State University alumni
University of West Georgia alumni
University of Georgia alumni
Schoolteachers from South Carolina
Women state legislators in South Carolina
Republican Party members of the South Carolina House of Representatives
21st-century American women